Maïmouna Hélène Diarra, also Helena Diarra (1955 – June 10, 2021) was a Malian actress known for playing the roles of older women from her young age. She is the CEO of the International Fund for the Development of Active Retirement (FIDRA).<ref>{{Cite web |url=https://news.abidjan.net/h/623155.html |title=4th edition of the Active Retirement Day / Hélène Diarra: `` retirement is not an end of life, but continuity in action  |author=Elisha, B. |date=September 29, 2017 |publisher=@bidj@an.net |language=French |access-date=November 30, 2020}}</ref> She is the Vice President of the Professional Association of Decentralized Financial Systems of Côte d'Ivoire (Apsfd-CI).

Early life and education
Diarra was born in 1955 in Segou, Mali but got orphaned at an early age and was raised by her uncles and grandmother. In 1975, she got admitted into the National Pedagogical Institute for a Diploma of Fundamental Studies (DEF) in the teaching profession. After a switch to sports, between 1975 and 1977 she played for the Bamako Reds women's basketball team. In 1981, she obtained a diploma in theatre arts at the National Arts Institute (INA).

Career
In 2000, she was featured as "Aminate" in Michael Haneke's drama film, Code Unknown. Other cast include: Aïssa Maïga, Juliette Binoche, Thierry Neuvic, Josef Bierbichler and others.

In 2004, she was featured in Ousmane Sembène's Bambara language film, Moolaadé, playing the role of "Hadjatou". Other cast include: Fatoumata Coulibaly and Salimata Traoré. The film was presented at the 2007 Ebertfest. It was nominated for a "Best Film" award at the Cannes Film Festival.

In 2006, she was starred in Abderrahmane Sissako's drama film, Bamako'', in which she played the role of "Saramba". Other cast featured include: Aïssa Maïga and Tiécoura Traoré.

Filmography

References

External links
 Hélène Diarra on IMDb
 Maimouna Hélène Diarra on Premiere

Living people
Malian actresses
1955 births
People from Ségou
21st-century Malian people